The Seth Hays House is a historic house at 203 Wood Street in Council Grove, Kansas. Seth Hays, the first white settler in Council Grove, built the house in 1867. A Missouri native, Hays originally moved to Council Grove to start a trading post for Boone & Hamilton; he eventually owned the trading post himself, and he also started a local newspaper and the town's first bank. The house was Hays' third in Council Grove; he built a log cabin for himself in 1847, the year he settled in Council Grove, and moved to a brick dwelling in 1860. The 1867 house is a one-story vernacular brick building with an L-shaped plan. While living in Missouri, Hays enslaved a woman named Sarah Taylor, also known as Aunt Sallie. After Kansas became a state and abolished slavery in 1861, she stayed with Hays as a servant, and she lived in the house's basement.

The house was added to the National Register of Historic Places on September 25, 1975.

References

		
National Register of Historic Places in Morris County, Kansas
Houses on the National Register of Historic Places in Kansas
Houses completed in 1867